Whitey was an American band playing rock, funk and Latin styles from 1989 to 1997. Originating in Denton, Texas, Whitey was popular in the Dallas and Austin scenes including Deep Ellum and became known for its wild stage antics.  They toured extensively throughout Texas, Oklahoma, Kansas, Louisiana, and Arkansas.

In 1994, Whitey won the Dallas Observer music award for best funk/ group.

Whitey was formed in Denton in the early 1990s, the brain child of Corey Korn while playing in another Denton band called the Cowtippers. The original name was to be Kill Whitey (an ironic twist on a mainly white funk band), but Corey thought it might be too extreme and shortened it to Whitey.

Past band members
 Chris Veon (Catfish) - vocals, guitar
 Zac Baird (Zaphrodesiac) - vocals, keyboards
 Carl (Captain Carl) - vocals, keys
 Corey Korn (Fuzzy Bubba) - bass, vocals
 Andrew Barefoot (Speed Jesus) - bass
 Eric Korb (?) - guitar, vocals, trumpet
 David Willingham (Dr. Lovedaddy) - guitar
 Austin Castillo (Mr. December 27) - lead birthday
 Thad Scott (Neckbone) - saxophone
 Raul Vallejo (Rolo the Latin Lover) - trombone
 Fernando Castillo (Frog Leg) - trumpet 
 William Brown (Bill 10") - Sax&10"
 J. Walter Hawkes (Pork Chop) - trombone
 Phill (Peanut) - drums
 David C (?) - percussion, drums
 Jesse (?) - drums
 Toby Sheets (Marijuanicus) - drums, percussion, vocals
 Mike (?) - drums
 Eric Hansen (Superfoot) - drums
 John Speice (?) - drums
 Go Go Ray (?) - drums
 Chris L (The Professor) - percussion, drums
 Laura Elizabeth Sinks (Magic Momma) - vocals
 Rebecca (Madame Miracle) - vocals
 Shawna (Sister Sunshine) - vocals
 Trey (?) - vocals
 J Rob (J Rob) - vocals
 Brit Davis (Duck Butter) - drums, percussion, dance

Discography

Albums
 Whitey  - 1992 (cassette)
 Up on the Deeper Still  - 1994 (cassette)

Compilation albums
 Tales From The Edge  - 1992 KDGE-FM (CD) Album Information
 Denton Discoveries  - 1993 (CD)

Bootlegs
 Black Label Days - 1998 (CD)

References

External links
  Whitey Myspace Fanpage containing 2 tracks

Rock music groups from Texas